The 1997 Calgary Stampeders finished in 2nd place in the West Division with a 10–8 record. They appeared in the West Semi-Final and lost to the Saskatchewan Roughriders.

Offseason

CFL Draft

Ottawa Rough Riders Dispersal Draft

Preseason

Regular season

Season standings

Season schedule

Awards and records
Jeff Nicklin Memorial Trophy – Jeff Garcia (QB)

1997 CFL All-Stars

Western All-Star selections

Playoffs

West Semi-Final

References

Calgary Stampeders seasons
Calg
Calgary Stampeders